The Collective, Inc. was an American video game developer based in Newport Beach, California. Founded in 1997 by ex-Virgin Entertainment employees, the company merged with Backbone Entertainment in 2005 to create Foundation 9 Entertainment. Under Foundation 9, The Collective was merged with Shiny Entertainment and into Double Helix Games in October 2007.

History 
The Collective was founded in 1997 by brothers Douglas and Richard Hare, together with Gary Priest, upon leaving Virgin Interactive. Works by The Collective include Star Trek: Deep Space Nine: The Fallen, Buffy the Vampire Slayer, Indiana Jones and the Emperor's Tomb, Marc Ecko's Getting Up: Contents Under Pressure, and The Da Vinci Code.

On March 29, 2005, it was announced that The Collective was merging with Backbone Entertainment, another game developer, to form Foundation 9 Entertainment. The Collective's Douglas Hare, Richard Hare and Gary Priest became the new company's co-president, chief creative officer and co-chairman, respectively. On October 9, 2007, Foundation 9 announced that The Collective were being merged with another subsidiary, Shiny Entertainment; both studios had relocated their teams to new  offices in Irvine, California, from where the merged company would operate under the lead of Shiny's Michael Persson. In March 2008, the new studio was named Double Helix Games.

Games developed

Cancelled games 
Several games are known to have been in development at the studio before they were cancelled. That includes games based on licenses such as Witchblade, a follow-up to their Indiana Jones title, a game featuring Jonathan Harker from Dracula, and Dirty Harry.

References 

American companies established in 1997
American companies disestablished in 2007
Companies based in Newport Beach, California
Defunct companies based in Greater Los Angeles
Video game companies established in 1997
Video game companies disestablished in 2007
Defunct video game companies of the United States
Video game development companies
1997 establishments in California
2007 disestablishments in California